opened in Kitashiobara, Fukushima Prefecture, Japan, in 1999. It is situated within Bandai-Asahi National Park, near Goshiki-numa and with views of Mount Bandai. The permanent collection includes over three hundred forty pieces by Salvador Dalí which makes it the fourth largest Dalí Museum in the world and the sole Dalí Museum in Asia, as well as works by Sisley, Cézanne, Renoir, Matisse and Picasso.

References

External links
 Morohashi Museum of Modern Art
  Morohashi Museum of Modern Art

Museums in Fukushima Prefecture
Kitashiobara, Fukushima
Art museums and galleries in Japan
Art museums established in 1999
Biographical museums in Japan
1999 establishments in Japan
Salvador Dalí